László Tóth (born 9 July 1995) is a Hungarian professional footballer who plays for Szolnok.

Club statistics

Updated to games played as of 9 September 2014.

References

Player profile at HLSZ 

1995 births
People from Jászberény
Living people
Hungarian footballers
Association football midfielders
Hungary youth international footballers
Fehérvár FC players
Puskás Akadémia FC players
Balmazújvárosi FC players
Mezőkövesdi SE footballers
Szolnoki MÁV FC footballers
Kazincbarcikai SC footballers
Vasas SC players
Nemzeti Bajnokság I players
Nemzeti Bajnokság II players
Sportspeople from Jász-Nagykun-Szolnok County